The Exportation of Arms Act 1900 (63 & 64 Vict. c.44), long title An Act to amend the Law relating to the Exportation of Arms, Ammunition, and Military and Naval Stores, was an Act of Parliament of the Parliament of the United Kingdom, given Royal Assent on 6 August 1900

and repealed in 1986.

It provided that the monarch, by proclamation, had the power to prohibit the export of certain classes of military equipment, or "any article ... capable of being converted into or made useful in increasing the quantity" of such equipment, when it was necessary to prevent the equipment being used against British or allied citizens or military forces.

The material so proclaimed was to be considered "prohibited goods" under the Customs and Inland Revenue Act 1879, and dealt with as though it were listed in section 8 of that Act.

The Act was repealed by the Statute Law (Repeals) Act 1986.

References
The public general acts passed in the sixty-third and sixty-third and sixty-fourth years of the reign of her majesty Queen Victoria. London: printed for Her Majesty's Stationery Office. 1900.
Chronological table of the statutes; HMSO, London. 1993.

United Kingdom Acts of Parliament 1900
United Kingdom military law
Repealed United Kingdom Acts of Parliament